Nicholas "Nico" Williams Arthuer (born 12 July 2002) is a Spanish professional footballer who plays as a winger for La Liga club Athletic Bilbao and the Spain national team.

Club career
Born in Pamplona, Navarre, Williams joined the youth academy of Athletic Bilbao in 2013 from hometown side CA Osasuna. He began his senior career with the club's farm team, Basconia, during the 2019–20 season.

On 11 May 2020, Williams was promoted to the reserve team in the Segunda División B. He made his first team – and La Liga – debut on 28 April of the following year, coming on as a second-half substitute for Jon Morcillo in a 2–2 home draw against Real Valladolid; his brother Iñaki also came off the bench ten minutes later. It was the first time two siblings had been on the pitch at the same time for the club since Julio and Patxi Salinas in 1986.

Williams scored his first two goals for the Lions on 6 January 2022, in a 2–0 win over Atlético Mancha Real in the campaign's Copa del Rey. Seven days later, he scored the winning goal in a 2–1 victory over Atlético Madrid in the semi-final of the 2021–22 Supercopa de España. On 20 January 2022, Williams was given a first team contract after meeting a number of clauses.

Williams was a starter in four of the first five matches of the 2022–23 La Liga campaign, and was named player of the match in a 4–1 away win against Elche CF on 11 September 2022. In the first half-hour of the match he pressurised an opponent into conceding an own goal, won a penalty for a trip (converted by Oihan Sancet) then scored himself via a dribble from the right wing and powerful shot for his first goal in the competition. Coincidentally this was the same venue and opponent where his brother first found the net in the league seven years earlier. He scored again the following week, the decisive goal of a 3–2 victory over Rayo Vallecano and his first at San Mamés.

International career
Williams first represented Spain with the under-18 squad in 2020, scoring two goals in four games. He was called up to the Spain under-19s in February 2021, and made his debut for the under-21s in September of the same year. He received his first call-up to the senior squad, coached by Luis Enrique, for 2022–23 UEFA Nations League fixtures in September 2022.
On November 17 he scored his first goal for the national team in a friendly against Jordan and subsequently was called up for 2022 FIFA World Cup.

Personal life
Williams was born in Pamplona to Ghanaian parents, who travelled across the Sahara Desert to reach Melilla, an autonomous Spanish city located in North Africa. Nico's older brother, Iñaki Williams, is also a footballer and a forward; he too was brought up at Athletic Bilbao having been born in Spain a short time after his parents arrived there. Growing up, he was a fan of Asamoah Gyan.

Career statistics

Club

International

Spain score listed first, score column indicates score after each Williams goal.

See also 
Afro-Spaniards

References

External links
 
 
 
 
 
 

2002 births
Living people
Footballers from Pamplona
Spanish footballers
Spain international footballers
Spain youth international footballers
Spain under-21 international footballers
Spanish people of Ghanaian descent
Association football wingers
Athletic Bilbao footballers
CD Basconia footballers
Bilbao Athletic footballers
CA Osasuna players
La Liga players
Segunda División B players
Tercera División players
Spanish sportspeople of African descent
2022 FIFA World Cup players